This page shows the progress of Accrington Stanley F.C. in the 2008–09 football season. During the season, Accrington Stanley competed in League Two in the English league system.

League table

Results

Football League Two

FA Cup

League Cup

Football League Trophy

Players

First-team squad
Includes all players who were awarded squad numbers during the season.

Left club during season

References

Accrington Stanley F.C. seasons
Accrington Stanley